Francis Carson can refer to:
Frank Carson (ice hockey) (Reginald Francis Carson, 1902–1957), Canadian ice hockey player
Frank Carson (Hugh Francis Carson, 1926–2012), Irish comedian
Frank Hough (Francis Carson Hough, born 1944), Australian politician